"2 Legit 2 Quit" is a song by Hammer featuring Saja (a.k.a. Sonia Moore), released on September 5, 1991 as the first single from his fourth studio album, Too Legit to Quit (1991).

Music video
The music video was directed by Rupert Wainwright, and at almost 15 minutes in length, was one of the most expensive videos ever produced.

The uncut version of the video begins with a newscaster, played by Jim Belushi, reporting on Hammer's apparent decision to quit the music business, as well as responses from a number of celebrities. It then cuts to an impatient crowd waiting for Hammer to perform, while Hammer has a lengthy conversation with James Brown, who calls Hammer "Godson" and enlists him to get the glove of Michael Jackson. Brown endows Hammer with several blasts of energy before sending Hammer off to perform. The performance is high budget and laden with pyrotechnics. The video ends with a purported Jackson (seen only from behind) having seen the performance and conceding Hammer to be the superior dancer, while doing the "2 Legit 2 Quit" hand gesture. Hammer spoke with Jackson on the phone about the video, with Jackson giving his approval.

The song's music video features several athletes making cameo appearances. These athletes can be seen in the following order: José Canseco, Isiah Thomas, Kirby Puckett, Jerry Rice, Rickey Henderson, Deion Sanders, Andre Rison, Wayne Gretzky, Chris Mullin, Roger Clemens, Roger Craig, Ronnie Lott, Lynette Woodard, the Dallas Cowboys Cheerleaders, David Robinson, and former Atlanta Falcons coach Jerry Glanville. As a result of the appearance of various Falcons team members in the video, the 1991 team became known as the "2 Legit 2 Quit" Falcons, utilizing the song as their team theme song. The uncut version of the video also featured cameos from Danny Glover, Henry Winkler, Mark Wahlberg, Donnie Wahlberg, Eazy-E, DJ Quik, 2nd II None, Tony Danza, Queen Latifah and Milli Vanilli among others commenting on Hammer's apparent decision to quit.

The video was No. 5 in MAX Music's World's Worst Ever Video countdown, and No. 1 in its Forgotten Video Clips countdown in 2008. It was also voted No. 24 on MTV's all-time "25 Lame" countdown in 1999. However, it has been selected as a viewer's favorite by VH1.

A hand gesture became popular as a result of the title song and video which was also shown in the "Addams Groove" movie video and on MTV. It involved forming the number two for "Too", an L for "Legit", and a "cut" motion for "Quit" with the hand and fingers (as seen in the video).

Dance challenge
At the end of the "2 Legit 2 Quit" music video, after James Brown enlists Hammer to obtain the glove of Michael Jackson, a silver-white sequined glove is shown on the hand of a Jackson look-alike doing the "2 Legit 2 Quit" hand gesture. It was a reference to Hammer wanting to challenge Jackson to a dance-off for rights to his famous glove, which is also referenced on the album.

Hammer and Jackson would later appear, speak and perform at the funeral service for James Brown in 2006. M.C. Hammer appeared on The Wendy Williams Show on July 27, 2009 and told a story about a phone call he received from Michael Jackson, regarding the portion of the "2 Legit 2 Quit" video that included a fake Jackson, giving his approval and inclusion of it. He explained how Jackson had seen the video and liked it, and both expressed they were a fan of each other.

Televised performances
On the December 7, 1991 episode of Saturday Night Live, Hammer was the host and musical guest, performing "2 Legit 2 Quit" and two other songs.

In 1991, the song along with Hammer's "Addams Groove", was featured in the film The Addams Family.

For the opening of the 2010 BET Hip Hop Awards, Rick Ross, Diddy and DJ Khaled performed "MC Hammer" (from the Teflon Don album), at which point Hammer stepped out to perform "2 Legit 2 Quit".

At the 40th American Music Awards, in November 2012, Hammer danced to "2 Legit 2 Quit" and "Gangnam Style" alongside Psy, both wearing his signature Hammer pants. The mashup, suggested by Psy's manager, was repeated by the two stars on December 31, 2012 during Dick Clark's New Year's Rockin' Eve and was released on iTunes.

Track listing
 "2 Legit 2 Quit" (7" edit remix)
 "2 Legit 2 Quit" (Remix)
 "2 Legit 2 Quit" (Instrumental)

Charts
"2 Legit 2 Quit"proved to be successful in the U.S., peaking in the top 10 of the Billboard Hot 100 at No. 5. The single also peaked at No. 60 on the UK Singles Chart.

Peak positions

Year-end chart

Certifications

See also
List of most expensive music videos

References

1991 singles
MC Hammer songs
Songs written by MC Hammer
1991 songs
Capitol Records singles
Cultural depictions of Michael Jackson
Atlanta Falcons